Lyndsay Faye is an American author. Her first novel was the Sherlockian pastiche Dust and Shadow: An Account of the Ripper Killings by Dr. John H. Watson and she has been nominated for the Edgar Award for The Gods of Gotham and Jane Steele. The Gods of Gotham was named "the year’s best mystery novel" by the American Library Association.

Life
Having discovered Sir Arthur Conan Doyle's creation Sherlock Holmes when she was 10, her interest in the famous sleuth continues to be part of her life as a member of both The Baker Street Irregulars and Baker Street Babes. Faye described the debt all mystery authors owe to Conan Doyle saying "You can’t escape Sherlock Holmes as a mystery writer. You simply cannot. It would be like trying to deal with astrophysics without Newton or modern art without Picasso."

Faye attended R. A. Long High School as did her future spouse, Gabriel Lehner.

Career

2016 brought Faye's re-imagining of Charlotte Brontë's Jane Eyre titled Jane Steele.

Bibliography

Novels

Sherlock Holmes

story: 
"The Case of Colonel Warburton’s Madness" short story appearing in Sherlock Holmes in America (2009)

Timothy Wilde series

References

External links
Lyndsay Faye

Living people
21st-century American novelists
21st-century American historians
American women novelists
American women historians
21st-century American women writers
American historical novelists
Women historical novelists
American mystery novelists
Women mystery writers
Year of birth missing (living people)